Nesla Glacier is the 6.2 km (3.2 mi) long and 2 km (1.2 mi) wide glacier on Magnier Peninsula, Graham Coast on the west side of Antarctic Peninsula, situated southwest of Muldava Glacier and north of Kolosh Glacier.  It drains the west slopes of Lisiya Ridge west of Mount Perchot, and flows westwards into Bigo Bay next north of the terminus of Kolosh Glacier.

The glacier is named after the settlement of Nesla in Western Bulgaria.

Location
British mapping in 1971.

Maps
 British Antarctic Territory.  Scale 1:200000 topographic map. DOS 610 Series, Sheet W 65 64.  Directorate of Overseas Surveys, Tolworth, UK, 1971.
 Antarctic Digital Database (ADD). Scale 1:250000 topographic map of Antarctica. Scientific Committee on Antarctic Research (SCAR), 1993–2016.

References
 Bulgarian Antarctic Gazetteer. Antarctic Place-names Commission. (details in Bulgarian, basic data in English)
 Nesla Glacier. SCAR Composite Gazetteer of Antarctica

External links
 Nesla Glacier. Copernix satellite image

Bulgaria and the Antarctic
Glaciers of Graham Coast